The 2021 season was Lightning's second season, in which they competed in the 50 over Rachael Heyhoe Flint Trophy and the new Twenty20 competition, the Charlotte Edwards Cup. The side finished fourth in the Rachael Heyhoe Flint Trophy, with 3 wins from their 7 matches. In the Charlotte Edwards Cup, the side finished bottom of Group A, losing all 6 of their matches.
 
The side was captained by Kathryn Bryce and coached by Rob Taylor. They played their home matches at five grounds across the East Midlands: Trent Bridge, Grace Road, the County Ground, Derby, the Haslegrave Ground and Kibworth Cricket Club Ground.

Squad
Lightning announced their initial 18-player squad on 28 May 2021. Ella Claridge and Josie Groves were promoted to the senior squad from the Academy during the season, and played their first matches on 28 August 2021 and 10 September 2021, respectively. Age given is at the start of Lightning's first match of the season (29 May 2021).

Rachael Heyhoe Flint Trophy

Season standings

 Advanced to the final
 Advanced to the play-off

Fixtures

Tournament statistics

Batting

Source: ESPN Cricinfo Qualification: 100 runs.

Bowling

Source: ESPN Cricinfo Qualification: 5 wickets.

Charlotte Edwards Cup

Group A

 Advanced to the final
 Advanced to the semi-final

Fixtures

Tournament statistics

Batting

Source: ESPN Cricinfo Qualification: 50 runs.

Bowling

Source: ESPN Cricinfo Qualification: 5 wickets.

Season statistics

Batting

Bowling

Fielding

Wicket-keeping

References

The Blaze (women's cricket) seasons
2021 in English women's cricket